Choukri Abahnini (born 1960) is a former athlete from Tunisia who competed in the pole vault.

He competed for Tunisia in the 1984 African Championships held in Rabat, Morocco in the pole vault finishing in the bronze medal position with a performance of 4.40 m. At the following years African Championships held in Cairo, Egypt he improved this 4m60 enough to win the gold.  A feat he repeated at both the 1987 African Games held in Nairobi, Kenya and 1988 African Championships held in Annaba, Algeria with vaults of 4.90 m and 4.85 m respectively.

International competitions

1Representing Africa

External links
African Games results
African championships results
All-Athletics profile

Living people
1960 births
Tunisian male pole vaulters
African Games gold medalists for Tunisia
African Games medalists in athletics (track and field)
Athletes (track and field) at the 1987 All-Africa Games
20th-century Tunisian people